''Tόmame" is a song by Greek singer Eleni Foureira.

Personnel
 Written by: Alex P (BMG Publishing), Geraldo Sandell (Teddy Sky Songs), Markus Videsäter, Eleni Foureira 
 Produced by: Alex P, Markus Videsäter, Didrick 
 Backing vocals by: Teddy Sky 
 All instruments by: Alex P, Markus Videsäter
 Mixed and Mastered by: Kevin Grainger at Wired Masters

Charts

Release history

References

2019 singles
Eleni Foureira songs
Songs written by Alex P
Songs written by Geraldo Sandell
Number-one singles in Greece
English-language Greek songs